Calosoma algiricum is a species of ground beetle in the subfamily of Carabinae. It was described by Gehin in 1885.

References

algiricum
Beetles described in 1885